Nabbanja may refer to:

Proscovia Nabbanja, a Ugandan geologist and corporate executive
Robinah Nabbanja, a Ugandan school teacher, politician and cabinet minister